Aykut Hilmi (born in London, United Kingdom) is an actor of Italian and Turkish-Cypriot parentage. He is known for starring in the West End theatres and being part of the Royal National Theatre company. Aykut performed in [Shakespear] [Romeo & Juliet] as Mercutio at the Globe Theatre and was the first Turkish Actor to perform  at the London National Theatre on the Olivier Stage from verse to contemporary plays. His  film credits include the sequel to [Wonder Woman] [‘WW84’], [Harry Potters] [Fantastic Beasts-The Crimes of Grindlewald], [Mamma Mia] etc... He has also appeared in several TV dramas including [Jack Ryan], [War Machine], [24-Live Another Day], Zen, Spooks, The IT Crowd, One Night and was well known for his bad Boy role Nico Papadopoulos in EastEnders.

Theatre

Filmography

External links
 
 Aykut Hilmi profile

Cypriot male actors
British people of Turkish Cypriot descent
British people of Italian descent
English people of Italian descent
Male actors from London
English male stage actors
English male television actors
English male film actors
Living people
Year of birth missing (living people)